J. Thomas Newsome House is a historic home located at Newport News, Virginia. It was built in 1898, and is a -story, seven bay, asymmetrical, frame Queen Anne style dwelling.  It features a steeply pitched irregularly composed roof, three sided bay, front Palladian window, and corner tower.  From 1906 until 1942, it was the residence of J. Thomas Newsome (1869–1942), an African-American attorney and journalist.

The restored house is open to the public as the Newsome House Museum & Cultural Center, and features exhibits related to African-American art, history and culture.

It was listed on the National Register of Historic Places in 1990.

References

External links

African-American history of Virginia
African-American museums in Virginia
Historic house museums in Virginia
Houses completed in 1898
Houses in Newport News, Virginia
Houses on the National Register of Historic Places in Virginia
Museums in Newport News, Virginia
National Register of Historic Places in Newport News, Virginia
Queen Anne architecture in Virginia